List of people who oppose the BDS movement include those who have either voiced opposition to the BDS movement, accused it of antisemitism, called for reprisals against its leaders or spoken out against comprehensive boycotts against Israel. It does not include people who have been unwilling to commit to a boycott of Israel, only those actively opposing it.

See also 
 BDS movement
 List of supporters of the BDS movement

References

 
Opposition to Boycott, Divestment and Sanctions
Lists of people by ideology